Gabriel Ferreira Ioshida (born November 11, 1993) is a Brazilian male acrobatic gymnast. Along with his partner, Juliana Dos Reis de Freitas, he competed in the 2014 Acrobatic Gymnastics World Championships.

References

1993 births
Living people
Brazilian acrobatic gymnasts
Male acrobatic gymnasts